is a middle school and high school in Tokyo, Japan. It is located in Nishitōkyō, Tokyo, near Kichijōji Station.

Background
Musashino Joshi Gakuin is a Buddhist school. It is part of the Musashino University system, and it is located on the main university campus.

References

External links
  

Junior high schools in Japan
High schools in Tokyo
Nishitōkyō, Tokyo